I'm Famous and Frightened! is a Living TV reality TV show in which eight celebrities stayed for three nights in a "haunted" castle. They had to then do terrifying challenges to raise money for charity; each one was evicted until only the winner was left. From Series 2 onwards, a spin-off show, titled I'm Famous and Frightened Extra was introduced, presented by Brian Dowling.

Series 1 (2004)
The first series was broadcast on Friday 12 March 2004 and was set in Chillingham Castle in Northumberland. It was presented by Tim Vincent and Brian Dowling.

The featured celebrities were:

Series 2 (2004)
The second series was set in Fyvie Castle in Aberdeen and was presented by former contestant, Keith Chegwin. Start date: 16 July 2004.

The featured celebrities were:

Series 3 (2004)
The third series was set in Dover Castle and was still presented by Keith Chegwin. Start date: 2 October 2004.

Series 4 (2005)
The fourth series aired in February 2005; it was set in Bolsover Castle and was presented by Claire Sweeney.

Transmissions

External links

British game shows
Paranormal television
2004 British television series debuts
2005 British television series endings
2000s British reality television series
Sky Living original programming
English-language television shows